Guttigera is a genus of moths in the family Gracillariidae.

Species
Guttigera albicaput Diakonoff, 1955  
Guttigera rhythmica Diakonoff, 1955 
Guttigera schefflerella Kobayashi, Huang & Hirowatari, 2013

External links
Global Taxonomic Database of Gracillariidae (Lepidoptera) 

Phyllocnistinae
Gracillarioidea genera